San Diego University may refer to the following in San Diego, California:
San Diego University, merged with the San Diego College of Women in 1972 to form the University of San Diego, a private Roman Catholic research university
San Diego State University, public research university in the California State University system
University of California, San Diego, public research university in the UC school system
San Diego University for Integrative Studies, small, private university
San Diego City College, public, two-year community college

See also
Education in San Diego